Round Lake Heights is a village in Lake County, Illinois, United States. Per the 2020 census, the population was 2,622.

Geography
Round Lake Heights is located at  (42.384821, -88.100525).

Major streets
 Fairfield Road
 Rollins Road
 Lotus Drive
 Blackcherry Lane/Chippewa Trail/Ojibwa Trail/Navajo Trail

Demographics

2020 census

Note: the US Census treats Hispanic/Latino as an ethnic category. This table excludes Latinos from the racial categories and assigns them to a separate category. Hispanics/Latinos can be of any race.

2000 Census
As of the census of 2000, there were 1,347 people, 425 households, and 339 families residing in the village. The racial makeup of the village was 82.33% White, 2.08% African American, 0.15% Native American, 1.11% Asian, 0.07% Pacific Islander, 10.54% from other races, and 3.71% from two or more races. Hispanic or Latino of any race were 21.38% of the population.

There were 425 households, out of which 46.6% had children under the age of 18 living with them, 62.1% were married couples living together, 13.2% had a female householder with no husband present, and 20.2% were non-families. 14.6% of all households were made up of individuals, and 4.0% had someone living alone who was 65 years of age or older. The average household size was 3.17 and the average family size was 3.49.

In the village, the population was spread out, with 31.3% under the age of 18, 10.2% from 18 to 24, 37.3% from 25 to 44, 15.6% from 45 to 64, and 5.6% who were 65 years of age or older. The median age was 29 years. For every 100 females, there were 101.0 males. For every 100 females age 18 and over, there were 99.8 males.

The median income for a household in the village was $54,706, and the median income for a family was $60,000. Males had a median income of $39,250 versus $28,529 for females. The per capita income for the village was $17,868. About 4.3% of families and 5.9% of the population were below the poverty line, including 8.3% of those under age 18 and 4.1% of those age 65 or over.

Elected officials
Mayor
Terry Lumpkins

Trustees
Anthony Pekar
Jeff Katzel
Andrew Walker
Jack Germann
Dominick Mahoney
Marva Meeks

Clerk
Marla McIntyre

References

External links
 Village of Round Lake Heights

Villages in Illinois
Villages in Lake County, Illinois
Majority-minority cities and towns in Lake County, Illinois